The Gold Coast Suns was one of the eight original franchises that played in the Senior Professional Baseball Association in its inaugural 1989 season. The club split their home games between the cities of Miami and Pompano Beach in Florida.

Earl Weaver managed the Suns, who hired former All-Star Pedro Ramos as their pitching coach. Bright spots included pitcher Joaquín Andújar, who posted a 5–0 record with a 1.31 earned run average, and shortstop Bert Campaneris as the oldest everyday player in the league at 47, who hit a .291 batting average and stole 16 bases in 60 games.

But the Suns struggled for most of the season, ending with a 32–39 record and out of the playoffs. Without a fan base, the team averaged 985 fans per game, about half of the attendance projected, and folded at the end of the season.

Notable players

Joaquín Andújar 
Stan Bahnsen 
Paul Blair
Bert Campaneris
Paul Casanova  
César Cedeño  
Ken Clay  
Mike Cuellar
Jesús de la Rosa 
Joe Decker 
Taylor Duncan  
Jim Essian
Ed Figueroa 
Jim Gideon 
Orlando González 
Ross Grimsley 
Glenn Gulliver 
Ed Halicki 
George Hendrick
Grant Jackson 
Cliff Johnson 
Mike Kekich 
Rafael Landestoy 
Larry Milbourne
Bob Molinaro
Sid Monge
Bobby Ramos 
Frank Riccelli
Tom Shopay
Rennie Stennett 
Derrel Thomas
Luis Tiant
Steve Whitaker

References

Defunct baseball teams in Florida
Senior Professional Baseball Association teams
Baseball teams in Miami
Pompano Beach, Florida
1989 establishments in Florida
1989 disestablishments in Florida
Baseball teams established in 1989
Sports clubs disestablished in 1989